is a Japanese novel written by Hiroshi Seko.  The book is a spinoff of the manga series Attack on Titan by Hajime Isayama.  A manga adaptation began serialization in August 2015 and ran until May 2016. A three-part original anime DVD adaptation was released on December 8, 2017, April 9, 2018 and August 9, 2018 with the 24th, 25th, and 26th limited edition volumes of the original manga, respectively.

Plot
The stories are about two female characters in the series: Mikasa Ackerman and Annie Leonhart. "Lost in the cruel world" is about Mikasa and her relationship with Eren, featuring a vision in an alternative universe where her parents weren’t murdered. "Wall Sina, Goodbye" is about Annie and her life as a member of the Military Police Brigade in the time before she attempts to capture Eren on a Survey Corps reconnaissance mission. "Lost Girls" is about their interaction during training and the reconnaissance mission.

Publication
The novel is based on two mini-visual novels from Nitroplus, which were included with the third and sixth volumes of the Attack on Titan anime Blu-ray release.  The first, Lost in the Cruel World, was written by Seko and released on September 18, 2013.  The second, titled Wall Sina, Goodbye, also by Seko, was released on December 18, 2013.

The novel is written by Hiroshi Seko, who worked as a scriptwriter for the anime.  Kodansha published it in December 2014 under their Kodansha Comics Deluxe imprint.  It consists of three short stories, titled "Lost in the cruel world", "Wall Sina, Goodbye", and "Lost Girls".

North American publisher Vertical announced their license to the novel at Anime Expo 2015  and released it on June 28, 2016.

Manga
A manga adaptation by Ryōsuke Fuji began serialization in Kodansha's magazine Bessatsu Shōnen Magazine on August 9, 2015.  The series ended in the June 2016 issue of the magazine on May 9, 2016. Kodansha compiled it in two volumes in 2016.

In March 2016, Kodansha USA announced that they had licensed the series, and they released it in English in 2016 and 2017.

Volumes

Anime
The anime adaptation was released as three-part original anime DVD, along with the 24th, 25th, and 26th limited edition volumes of the original Attack on Titan manga, respectively. On May 2, 2022, it was announced that Attack on Titan's eight OVAs would be dubbed and released by Funimation and Crunchyroll weekly starting on May 8, 2022. The Lost Girls OVAs were released from June 12 to 26.

Episode list

Reception
Volume one of the manga reached 15th place on the weekly Oricon comic rankings, and sold a total of 80,619 copies.

See also
 Shangri-La Frontier: the manga adaptation of which is illustrated by Ryōsuke Fuji

References

External links
  at Bessatsu Shōnen Magazine 
 

2014 Japanese novels
Anime and manga based on novels
Anime composed by Hiroyuki Sawano
Anime OVAs composed by Hiroyuki Sawano
Lost Girls
Crunchyroll anime
Funimation
Kodansha books
Kodansha manga
Shōnen manga
Vertical (publisher) titles
Wit Studio